The Austrian national rugby league team are the national rugby league team of Austria. They were created to continue the spread of the game of rugby league football throughout Central Europe.  Austria have played matches against a number of other European countries and also competed in the Central Europe Development Tri-Nations in 2006 alongside Germany and Estonia.

Results
Results for the 2006 Central Europe Development Tri-Nations.
Austria 56-32 Estonia (2 September 2006)
Germany 34-32 Austria (25 June 2006)

See also

References

External links

National rugby league teams
Rugby league in Austria
R